Jingkou District is one of three districts of Zhenjiang, Jiangsu province, China. The district has an area of 115 km2 and a population of 410,000 people.  The postal code for Jingkou is 212001 and the telephone code is 0511.

In recent years, it was split to form Zhenjiang New Area which is divided to 2 subdistricts (Dagang Subdistrict (大港街道), Dingmao Subdistrict (丁卯街道)) and 3 towns (Dalu (大路镇), Yaoqiao (姚桥镇), Dinggang (丁岗镇)).

History
Jingkou was the site of the original meeting place between the Grand Canal and the Yangtze River. It was the site of an imperial army garrison under the Qing.

Administrative divisions
Jingkou District has 8 subdistricts and 3 towns.
8 subdistricts

3 towns
 Yaoqiao
 Dalu
 Dinggang

Transportation
Dagang South railway station is situated here.

References 

County-level divisions of Jiangsu